Virsto develops a VM-centric storage hypervisor. The company is privately funded and headquartered in Sunnyvale, California. On February 11, 2013, VMware announced that it had signed a definitive agreement to acquire Virsto.

History 
Virsto was founded in 2007 by Mark Davis, Alex Miroshnichenko and Serge Pashenkov. In 2009, the company announced a $7 million series A funding round. In 2011, the company announced a $17 million series B funding round.

See also 
 Storage hypervisor
 Storage virtualization
 Software defined storage

References

Further reading 
 CRN, June 21, 2010. 2010 Storage Superstars: 25 You Need To Know.
 Dan Kusnetzky, ZDNet, April 21, 2011. Virtual Storage for Virtual Environments.
 Jacob Nthoiwa, ITWeb, September 28, 2010. Virtualisation Top of SME IT Spend.
 InformationWeek, May 9, 2012. Virsto Storage Hypervisor Now Supports Citrix XenDesktop.
 All Things Digital, November 21, 2012. The Storage Games.
 Enterprise Systems Journal, December 3, 2012. Virsto for vSphere 2.0 Delivers Software-Defined Storage to the Data Center.
 ZDnet, January 18, 2013. Is Storage Virtualization the Missing Link in vSphere Environments?.

External links 
 Virsto

Defunct software companies of the United States
Computer storage companies
Companies based in Sunnyvale, California